Lasiacantha is a genus of true bugs belonging to the family Tingidae.

The species of this genus are found in Europe and Australia.

Species:
 Lasiacantha absimilis Drake, 1951 
 Lasiacantha adamah Symonds & Cassis, 2013

References

Tingidae